Ian McLauchlain (27 June 1948 – 12 January 2008) was an Australian water polo player. He competed in the men's tournament at the 1972 Summer Olympics.

References

1948 births
2008 deaths
Australian male water polo players
Olympic water polo players of Australia
Water polo players at the 1972 Summer Olympics
Water polo players from Sydney